Ridley's bat (Myotis ridleyi) is a species of vesper bat. It is found in Indonesia and Malaysia.

References

Mouse-eared bats
Taxonomy articles created by Polbot
Mammals described in 1898
Taxa named by Oldfield Thomas
Bats of Southeast Asia